Kim Hyun-Kwan (born 20 April 1985) is a South Korean football winger. He currently plays for Cheongju Jikji FC in the South Korean Challengers League.

He played for South Korean club FC Seoul, Changwon City FC and Finnish club JJK.

Club career statistics

References

External links
 

1985 births
South Korean footballers
South Korean expatriate footballers
Living people
FC Seoul players
JJK Jyväskylä players
Changwon City FC players
K League 1 players
Korea National League players
Veikkausliiga players
K3 League players
South Korean expatriate sportspeople in Finland
Expatriate footballers in Finland
Dongguk University alumni
Association football midfielders
People from Cheongju
Sportspeople from North Chungcheong Province